The 2009 Clemson Tigers baseball team represented Clemson University in the 2009 NCAA Division I baseball season. The team played their home games at Doug Kingsmore Stadium in Clemson, SC.

The team was coached by Jack Leggett in his sixteenth season at Clemson.

Preseason 
On January 27, 2009, the coaches in the ACC picked Clemson to finish second in the Atlantic Division behind Florida State. Overall, the Tigers were picked third behind North Carolina and Florida State respectively.

Regular season 
On March 5, 2009, Head Coach Jack Leggett announced that Fifth-year shortstop Stan Widmann had left the team due to personal reasons. Widmann, who graduated from Clemson with a degree in sport management the previous December, had withdrawn from school to pursue job opportunities.

On Wednesday, March 18, pitchers Justin Sarratt, Scott Weismann, Kyle Deese, Tomas Cruz, and Matt Vaughn combined to pitch a no-hitter in Clemson's 14–0 victory over USC Upstate at Doug Kingsmore Stadium. It was the Tigers' 14th no-hitter in school history and first since the second game of a doubleheader on March 6, 1984, when Scott Parrish no-hit The Citadel in a seven-inning game. It was also just the second no-hitter involving multiple pitchers in Tiger history.

On Tuesday, April 21, sophomore outfielder Jeff Shaus hit a walk-off grand slam to lift the Tigers to a 5–3 victory over the visiting Coastal Carolina Chanticleers. It was Clemson's first walk-off home run since April 27, 2007, when Doug Hogan hit a walk-off solo homer to top Georgia Tech 3–2 in 11 innings. It was also the second walk-off grand slam in Tiger history, matching the walk-off grand slam hit by Tyler Colvin in the Tigers' 11–8 win over Oral Roberts in the 2006 Clemson Super Regional.

Postseason

ACC tournament 
Clemson went 1–2 in the 2009 ACC baseball tournament with losses to 7-seeded Duke and eventual champs, 6-seeded Virginia. On May 23, in their final game of the tournament, Clemson beat 2-seeded and top-five nationally ranked North Carolina in eleven innings in front of a crowd of 6,956. This set a record for the highest attendance ever at a college baseball game in the state of North Carolina.

NCAA tournament 
Clemson was awarded a host site for the regional round of the 2009 NCAA Division I baseball tournament. After beating 4-seeded Tennessee Tech in their first game of the regional, the Tigers would lose their next game to the 3-seeded Oklahoma State Cowboys. Clemson then proceeded to win their next three games to advance out of the loser's bracket and on to the Super Regional round of the tournament. With the win, Jack Leggett extended his streak to 11–0 in home games that clinch a regional or super regional championship.

In the Super Regionals, Clemson traveled to Tempe, Arizona to take on the number five national seed Arizona State. The Sun Devils defeated Clemson in the first two games of the best-of-three series, earning a trip to the College World Series in Omaha, Nebraska. The losses ended Clemson's season with a record of 44 wins and 22 losses.

Coaching staff

Schedule/Results 

|- align="left" bgcolor="#ddffdd"
| Feb. 20* || Charlotte || style="text-align:center;" | #25 || Doug Kingsmore Stadium • Clemson, SC || Delk (1–0) || Yermal (0–1) ||  || style="text-align:center;" | 4,968 || W 8–3 || 1–0
|- align="left" bgcolor="#ddffdd"
| Feb. 21* || Charlotte || style="text-align:center;" | #25 || Doug Kingsmore Stadium • Clemson, SC || Dwyer (1–0) || Smith (0–1) ||  || style="text-align:center;" | 5,681 || W 4–0 || 2–0
|- align="left" bgcolor="#ddffdd"
| Feb. 22* || Charlotte || style="text-align:center;" | #25 || Doug Kingsmore Stadium • Clemson, SC || Hinson (1–0) || Pierce (0–1) ||  || style="text-align:center;" | 3,730 || W 6–510 || 3–0
|- align="left" bgcolor="#ddffdd"
| Feb. 25* || Wofford || style="text-align:center;" | #25 || Doug Kingsmore Stadium • Clemson, SC || Harman (1–0) || Rowland (0–1) ||  || style="text-align:center;" | 3,609 || W 8–2 || 4–0
|- align="left" bgcolor="#ffdddd"
| Feb. 28* || South Carolina || style="text-align:center;" | #25 || Doug Kingsmore Stadium • Clemson, SC(Carolina–Clemson rivalry) || Farotto (1–0) || Stoneburner (0–1) ||  || style="text-align:center;" | 4,917 || L 1–3 || 4–1
|- align="left" bgcolor="#DCDCDC"
| Mar. 1* || @ South Carolina || style="text-align:center;" | #25 || Carolina Stadium • Columbia, SC(Carolina–Clemson rivalry) ||colspan=8|Postponed (rain), Rescheduled for April 7th
|- align="left" bgcolor="#ffdddd"
| Mar. 3* || Furman || style="text-align:center;" | #21 || Doug Kingsmore Stadium • Clemson, SC || DeDecker (2–0) || Cruz (0–1) || Gottlieb (1) || style="text-align:center;" | 3,255 || L 2–414 ||4–2
|- align="left" bgcolor="#ddffdd"
| Mar. 4* || UNC-Asheville || style="text-align:center;" | #21 || Doug Kingsmore Stadium • Clemson, SC || Sarratt (1–0) || Wohlwend (1–3) ||   || style="text-align:center;" | 3,338 || W 17–2 || 5–2
|- align="left" bgcolor="#ddffdd"
| Mar. 6 || @ No. 2 North Carolina || style="text-align:center;" | #21 || Boshamer Stadium • Chapel Hill, NC || Cruz (1–1)  || Moran (0–1) ||  || style="text-align:center;" | 2,211 || W 5–410 || 6–2 (1–0)
|- align="left" bgcolor="#ffdddd"
| Mar. 7 || @ No. 2 North Carolina || style="text-align:center;" | #21 || Boshamer Stadium • Chapel Hill, NC || Warren (2–0) || Stoneburner (0–2) || Bates (1) || style="text-align:center;" | 4,100 || L 2–5 || 6–3 (1–1)
|- align="left" bgcolor="#ffdddd"
| Mar. 8 || @ No. 2 North Carolina || style="text-align:center;" | #21 || Boshamer Stadium • Chapel Hill, NC || Bates (1–1) || Harman (1–1) ||  || style="text-align:center;" | 2,625 || L 8–9 || 6–4 (1–2)
|- align="left" bgcolor="#ddffdd"
| Mar. 10* || Michigan State || style="text-align:center;" | #24 || Doug Kingsmore Stadium • Clemson, SC || Sarratt (2–0) || Wunderlich (0–2) ||  || style="text-align:center;" | 4,246 || W 15–2 || 7–4
|- align="left" bgcolor="#ddffdd"
| Mar. 11* || vs. Michigan State || style="text-align:center;" | #24 || Fluor Field at the West End • Greenville, SC(Greenville Drive College Baseball Series) || Stoneburner (1–2) || Corcoran (0–1)  ||  || style="text-align:center;" | 5,058 || W 6–1 || 8–4
|- align="left" bgcolor="#ddffdd"
| rowspan=2| Mar. 13 || Wake Forest || style="text-align:center;" | #24 || Doug Kingsmore Stadium • Clemson, SC || Cruz (2–1) || Kledzik (1–3) || Lamb (1) || rowspan=2 style="text-align:center;" | 3,292 || W 4–1 || 9–4 (2–2)
|- align="left" bgcolor="#ddffdd"
| Wake Forest || style="text-align:center;" | #24 || Doug Kingsmore Stadium • Clemson, SC || Harman (2–1) || Stadler (2–2) ||  || W 6–1 || 10–4 (3–2)
|- align="left" bgcolor="#ddffdd"
| Mar. 15 || Wake Forest || style="text-align:center;" | #24 || Doug Kingsmore Stadium • Clemson, SC || Dwyer (2–0) || Negus (1–1) ||  || style="text-align:center;" | 3,475 || W 7–3 || 11–4 (4–2)
|- align="left" bgcolor="#ddffdd"
| Mar. 17* || Presbyterian || style="text-align:center;" | #19 || Doug Kingsmore Stadium • Clemson, SC || Stoneburner (2–2) || Freeman (0–1) ||  || style="text-align:center;" | 4,081 || W 8–0 || 12–4
|- align="left" bgcolor="#ddffdd"
| Mar. 18* || USC-Upstate || style="text-align:center;" | #19 || Doug Kingsmore Stadium • Clemson, SC || Sarratt (3–0) || Moyer (1–4) ||  || style="text-align:center;" | 4,020 || W 14–0 || 13–4
|- align="left" bgcolor="#ffdddd"
| Mar. 20 || @ No. 24 Florida State || style="text-align:center;" | #19 || Dick Howser Stadium • Tallahassee, FL || Gilmartin (4–1) || Delk (1–1) || Marshall (4) || style="text-align:center;" | 5,195 || L 2–5 || 13–5 (4–3)
|- align="left" bgcolor="#ddffdd"
| Mar. 21 || @ No. 24 Florida State || style="text-align:center;" | #19 || Dick Howser Stadium • Tallahassee, FL || Vaughn (1–0) || Gast (1–2) || Harman (1) || style="text-align:center;" | 5,790 || W 8–711 || 14–5 (5–3)
|- align="left" bgcolor="#ffdddd"
| Mar. 22 || @ No. 24 Florida State || style="text-align:center;" | #19 || Dick Howser Stadium • Tallahassee, FL || Gast (2–2) || Sarratt (3–1) ||  || style="text-align:center;" | 5,125 || L 4–7 || 14–6 (5–4)
|- align="left" bgcolor="#ddffdd"
|rowspan=2| Mar. 24* || Elon || style="text-align:center;" | #20 || Doug Kingsmore Stadium • Clemson, SC || McKinney (1–0) || Harrilchak (0–1) || Vaughn (1) || rowspan=2 style="text-align:center;" | 4,469 || W 5–3 || 15–6
|- align="left" bgcolor="#ddffdd"
|| Elon || style="text-align:center;" | #20 || Doug Kingsmore Stadium • Clemson, SC || Gullickson (1–0) || Porter (0–1) || Cruz (1) || W 8–7 || 16–6
|- align="left" bgcolor="#ffdddd"
| Mar. 27 || @ Boston College || style="text-align:center;" | #20 || Eddie Pellagrini Diamond at John Shea Field • Chestnut Hill, MA || MacDonald (3–2) || Dwyer (2–1) ||  || style="text-align:center;" | 712 || L 1–13 || 16–7 (5–5)
|- align="left"  bgcolor="#ddffdd"
|rowspan=2|Mar. 28 || @ Boston College || style="text-align:center;" | #20 || Shea Field • Chestnut Hill, MA || Harman (3–1) || Leonard (1–1) || Cruz (2) ||rowspan=2 style="text-align:center;" | 1,210 || W 7–6 || 17–7 (6–5)
|- align="left" bgcolor="#ddffdd"
|| @ Boston College || style="text-align:center;" | #20 || Shea Field • Chestnut Hill, MA || Stoneburner (3–2) || Moran (2–1) || Vaughn (2) || W 5–3 || 18–7 (7–5)
|- align="left" bgcolor="#ffdddd"
| Mar. 31* || @ No. 1 Georgia|| style="text-align:center;" | #17 || Foley Field • Athens, GA || Leaver (3–0) || Dwyer (2–2) || Weaver (5) || style="text-align:center;" | 3,045 || L 5–6 || 18–8
|- align="left" bgcolor="#ffdddd"
| Apr. 1* || No. 1 Georgia || style="text-align:center;" | #17 || Doug Kingsmore Stadium • Clemson, SC || Harvil (2–0) || Vaughn (1–1) ||  || style="text-align:center;" | 5,239 || L 2–4 || 18–9
|- align="left" bgcolor="#ddffdd"
| Apr. 3 || Duke || style="text-align:center;" | #17 || Doug Kingsmore Stadium • Clemson, SC || McKinney (2–0) || Manno (2–4) ||  || style="text-align:center;" | 4,988 || W 7–3 || 19–9 (8–5)
|- align="left" bgcolor="#ffdddd"
| Apr. 4 || Duke || style="text-align:center;" | #17 || Doug Kingsmore Stadium • Clemson, SC || Wolcott (5–1) || Stoneburner (3–3) || Hassan (8) || style="text-align:center;" | 5,162 || L 7–10 || 19–10 (8–6)
|- align="left" bgcolor="#ddffdd"
| Apr. 5 || Duke || style="text-align:center;" | #17 || Doug Kingsmore Stadium • Clemson, SC || Dwyer (3–2) || Knott (2–1) ||  || style="text-align:center;" | 4,753 || W 10–1 || 20–10 (9–6)
|- align="left" bgcolor="#ffdddd"
| Apr. 7* || @ South Carolina || style="text-align:center;" | #20 || Carolina Stadium • Columbia, SC(Carolina–Clemson rivalry) || Johnson (2–0) || Harman (3–2) ||  || style="text-align:center;" | 8,078 || L 6–7 || 20–11
|- align="left" bgcolor="#ddffdd"
| Apr. 8* || South Carolina || style="text-align:center;" | #20 || Doug Kingsmore Stadium • Clemson, SC(Carolina–Clemson rivalry) || Vaughn (2–1) || Casey (0–1) || Stoneburner (1) || style="text-align:center;" | 5,865 || W 7–5 || 21–11
|- align="left" bgcolor="#ffdddd"
| rowspan=2|Apr. 11 || No. 5 Miami || style="text-align:center;" | #20 || Doug Kingsmore Stadium • Clemson, SC || Hernandez (4–2) || Harman (3–3) ||  || rowspan=2 style="text-align:center;" | 6,217 || L 8–12 || 21–12 (9–7)
|- align="left" bgcolor="#ddffdd"
| No. 5 Miami || style="text-align:center;" | #20 || Doug Kingsmore Stadium • Clemson, SC || Dwyer (4–2) || Gutierrez (2–4) ||  || W 9–1 || 22–12 (10–7)
|- align="left" bgcolor="#ddffdd"
| Apr. 12 || No. 5 Miami || style="text-align:center;" | #20 || Doug Kingsmore Stadium • Clemson, SC || Stoneburner (4–3) || Nazario (4–1) || Cruz (3) || style="text-align:center;" | 4,696 || W 9–6 || 23–12 (11–7)
|- align="left" bgcolor="#ddffdd"
| Apr. 14* || @ Western Carolina || style="text-align:center;" | #18 || Hennon Stadium • Cullowhee, NC || Stoneburner (5–3) || Ozar (2–3) ||  || style="text-align:center;" | 1,249 || W 11–1 || 24–12
|- align="left" bgcolor="#ddffdd"
| Apr. 15* || Western Carolina || style="text-align:center;" | #18 || Doug Kingsmore Stadium • Clemson, SC || Frederick (1–0) || Stewart (3–1) ||  || style="text-align:center;" | 4,721 || W 13–2 || 25–12
|- align="left" bgcolor="#ffdddd"
| Apr. 17 || @ Virginia Tech || style="text-align:center;" | #18 || English Field • Blacksburg, VA || Ballard (5–2) || Dwyer (4–3) || McDermott (1) || style="text-align:center;" | 1,097 || L 2–5 || 25–13 (11–8)
|- align="left" bgcolor="#ffdddd"
| Apr. 18 || @ Virginia Tech || style="text-align:center;" | #18 || English Field • Blacksburg, VA || Wright (4–1) || Sarratt (3–2) ||  || style="text-align:center;" | 2,672 || L 3–7 || 25–14 (11–9)
|- align="left" bgcolor="#ddffdd"
| Apr. 19 || @ Virginia Tech || style="text-align:center;" | #18 || English Field • Blacksburg, VA || Harman (4–3) || Price (3–2) ||  || style="text-align:center;" | 509 || W 8–1 || 26–14 (12–9)
|- align="left" bgcolor="#ddffdd"
| Apr. 21* || No. 19 Coastal Carolina || style="text-align:center;" | #20 || Doug Kingsmore Stadium • Clemson, SC || McKinney (3–0) || McCully (3–1) ||  || style="text-align:center;" | 3,860 || W 5–3 || 27–14
|- align="left" bgcolor="#ddffdd"
| Apr. 22* || @ South Carolina || style="text-align:center;" | #20 || Carolina Stadium • Columbia, SC(Carolina–Clemson rivalry) || Vaughn (3–1) || Westmoreland (3–2) ||  || style="text-align:center;" | 8,212 || W 12–2 || 28–14
|- align="left" bgcolor="#ffdddd"
| Apr. 24 || No. 7 Georgia Tech || style="text-align:center;" | #20 || Doug Kingsmore Stadium • Clemson, SC || McGuire (7–0) || Dwyer (4–4) || Brewster (1) || style="text-align:center;" | 5,584 || L 4–5 || 28–15 (12–10)
|- align="left" bgcolor="#ddffdd"
| Apr. 25 || No. 7 Georgia Tech || style="text-align:center;" | #20 || Doug Kingsmore Stadium • Clemson, SC || Harman (5–3) || Von Tersch (6–2) ||  || style="text-align:center;" | 6,109 || W 8–5 || 29–15 (13–10)
|- align="left" bgcolor="#ddffdd"
| Apr. 26 || No. 7 Georgia Tech || style="text-align:center;" | #20 || Doug Kingsmore Stadium • Clemson, SC || Delk (2–1) || Cumpton (2–1) || Weismann (1) || style="text-align:center;" | 5,164 || W 6–3 || 30–15 (14–10)
|- align="left" bgcolor="#ddffdd"
| May 2 || Maryland || style="text-align:center;" | #17 || Doug Kingsmore Stadium • Clemson, SC || Hinson (2–0) || Swinson (2–7) ||  || style="text-align:center;" | 4,847 || W 11–2 || 31–15 (15–10)
|- align="left" bgcolor="#ddffdd"
|rowspan=2| May 3 || Maryland || style="text-align:center;" | #17 || Doug Kingsmore Stadium • Clemson, SC || Weismann (1–0) || Harman (3–5) || Vaughn (3) ||rowspan=2 style="text-align:center;"| 5,792 || W 7–4 || 32–15 (16–10)
|- align="left" bgcolor="#ffdddd"
| Maryland || style="text-align:center;" | #17 || Doug Kingsmore Stadium • Clemson, SC || Blackwell (2–0) || Cruz (2–2) || Gentzler (6) || L 6–8 || 32–16 (16–11)
|- align="left" bgcolor="#DCDCDC"
| May 6* || vs. Furman || style="text-align:center;" | #19 || Fluor Field at the West End • Greenville, SC(Greenville Drive College Baseball Series) ||colspan=8|Postponed (rain), Rescheduled for May 11th
|- align="left" bgcolor="#ddffdd"
| May 8* || UNC-Wilmington || style="text-align:center;" | #19 || Doug Kingsmore Stadium • Clemson, SC || Delk (3–1) || Frankoff (2–5) ||  || style="text-align:center;" | 4,516 || W 13–2 || 33–16
|- align="left" bgcolor="#ddffdd"
| May 9* || UNC-Wilmington || style="text-align:center;" | #19 || Doug Kingsmore Stadium • Clemson, SC || Harman (6–3) || Roth (0–2) ||  || style="text-align:center;" | 4,885 || W 11–3 || 34–16
|- align="left" bgcolor="#ffdddd"
| May 10* || UNC-Wilmington || style="text-align:center;" | #19 || Doug Kingsmore Stadium • Clemson, SC || Harrold (3–1) || Cruz (2–3) || Booth (3) || style="text-align:center;" | 4,408 || L 3–4 || 34–17
|- align="left" bgcolor="#ddffdd"
| May 11* || vs. Furman || style="text-align:center;" | #14 || Fluor Field at the West End • Greenville, SC(Greenville Drive College Baseball Series) || Haselden (1–0) || Goldsberry (3–5) || Sarratt (1) || style="text-align:center;" | 4,324 || W 8–5 || 35–17
|- align="left" bgcolor="#ddffdd"
| May 12* || College of Charleston || style="text-align:center;" | #14 || Doug Kingsmore Stadium • Clemson, SC || Weismann (2–0) || Lucchese (1–2) || Vaughn (4) || style="text-align:center;" | 4,597 || W 5–2 || 36–17
|- align="left" bgcolor="#ddffdd"
| May 14 || @ NC State || style="text-align:center;" | #14 || Doak Field • Raleigh, NC || Delk (4–1) || Gillheeney (6–5) ||  || style="text-align:center;" | 804 || W 15–8 || 37–17 (17–11)
|- align="left" bgcolor="#ddffdd"
| May 15 || @ NC State || style="text-align:center;" | #14 || Doak Field • Raleigh, NC || Harman (7–3) || Lambert (1–5) ||  || style="text-align:center;" | 1,245 || W 11–5 || 38–17 (18–11)
|- align="left" bgcolor="#ddffdd"
| May 16 || @ NC State || style="text-align:center;" | #14 || Doak Field • Raleigh, NC || McKinney (4–0) || Buchanan (2–6) || Cruz (4) || style="text-align:center;" | 1,149 || W 5–4 || 39–17 (19–11)
|- align="left"
| colspan=11|*Non-Conference Game. #Rankings from ESPN/USA Today Coaches Poll. 1Note that rankings above 25 are not official rankings. They are representations of ranking based on the number of points received in the weekly poll.
|-

|- align="left" bgcolor="#ffdddd"
|May 21 || vs. No. 6 Virginia || style="text-align:center;" | #3 || Durham Bulls Athletic Park • Durham, NC || Carraway (6–1) || Weismann (2–1) || Arico (9) || style="text-align:center;" | 1,639 || L 5–6 || 39–18 (0–1)
|- align="left" bgcolor="#ffdddd"
|May 22 || vs. No. 7 Duke || style="text-align:center;" | #3 || Durham Bulls Athletic Park • Durham, NC || Wolcott (8–3) || Dwyer (4–5) ||  || style="text-align:center;" | 2,763 || L 4–10 || 39–19 (0–2)
|- align="left" bgcolor="#ddffdd"
|May 23 || vs. No. 2 North Carolina || style="text-align:center;" | #3 || Durham Bulls Athletic Park • Durham, NC || Stoneburner (6–3) || Johnson (2–2) ||  || style="text-align:center;" | 6,956 || W 4–311 || 40–19 (1–2)
|- align="left"
| colspan=11|#Rankings indicate tournament seeds
|-

|- align="left" bgcolor="#ddffdd"
|May 29 || No. 4 Tennessee Tech || style="text-align:center;" | #1 || Doug Kingsmore Stadium • Clemson, SC|| Stoneburner (7–3) || L. Henry (9–3) ||  || style="text-align:center;" | 5,720 || W 5–4 || 41–19 (1–0)
|- align="left" bgcolor="#ffdddd"
|May 30 || No. 3 Oklahoma State || style="text-align:center;" | #1 || Doug Kingsmore Stadium • Clemson, SC|| McCurry (4–1) || Hinson (2–1) ||  || style="text-align:center;" | 5,740 || L 2–3 || 41–20 (1–1)
|- align="left" bgcolor="#ddffdd"
|rowspan=2|May 31 || No. 4 Tennessee Tech || style="text-align:center;" | #1 || Doug Kingsmore Stadium • Clemson, SC|| Weismann (3–1) || Choate (1–2) ||  || style="text-align:center;" | 3,628 || W 10–0 || 42–20 (2–1)
|- align="left" bgcolor="#ddffdd"
| No. 3 Oklahoma State || style="text-align:center;" | #1 || Doug Kingsmore Stadium • Clemson, SC|| Dywer (5–5) || Blanford (7–4) ||  || style="text-align:center;" | 4,367 || W 15–1 || 43–20 (3–1)
|- align="left" bgcolor="#ddffdd"
|June 1 || No. 3 Oklahoma State || style="text-align:center;" | #1 || Doug Kingsmore Stadium • Clemson, SC|| Vaughn (4–1) || Lyons (7–6) ||  || style="text-align:center;" | 6,217 || W 6–5 || 44–20 (4–1)
|- align="left"
| colspan=11|#Rankings indicate regional seeds
|-

|- align="left" bgcolor="#ffdddd"
|June 6 || No. 5 Arizona State ||  || Packard Stadium • Tempe, AZ|| Leake (16–1) || Stoneburner (7–4) || Lambson (5) || style="text-align:center;" | 4,381 || L 4–7 || 44–21 (4–2)
|- align="left" bgcolor="#ffdddd"
|June 7 || No. 5 Arizona State ||  || Packard Stadium • Tempe, AZ || Spence (9–1) || Dwyer (5–6) ||  || style="text-align:center;" | 4,406 || L 2–8 || 44–22 (4–3)
|- align="left"
| colspan=11|#Rankings indicate national seeds
|-

Awards and honors 

Wilson Boyd
 ACC All-Tournament Team
 Clemson Regional All-Tournament Team
Chris Dwyer
 ACC Pitcher of the Week, April 13
 Clemson Regional All-Tournament Team
Chris Epps
 Clemson Regional All-Tournament Team
 Clemson Regional MVP
Mike Freeman
 Clemson Regional All-Tournament Team
Casey Harman
 ACC All-Tournament Team

Kyle Parker
 Preseason Brooks Wallace Award Watch List
 ACC Player of the Week, April 13
Ben Paulsen
 Preseason Brooks Wallace Award Watch List
 Baseball America Preseason Third-Team All-American
 Clemson Regional All-Tournament Team
Jeff Schaus
 ACC Co-Player of the Week, April 27
 First Team, All-ACC
Matt Vaughn
 NCBWA Stopper of the Year Award Watch List

Rankings 

1- USA Today / ESPN did not release a poll after the first weekend of play.

Major League Baseball Draft

References 

Clemson Tigers Baseball Team, 2009
Clemson Tigers baseball seasons
Clemson baseball
Clemson